Marilena Neacșu (born 15 August 1961 in Sibiu, Romania) is a retired Romanian artistic gymnast. She won a silver medal with the Romanian team at the 1978 World Championships and was an alternate for the 1976 Summer Olympics.

Neacșu appeared in the 1990 Romanian/Canadian movie Campioana ("Reach for the Sky", or "La championne" in French). While shooting for the movie, she met her future husband, who was part of the crew. She then moved with him to Montreal, where they married and had three children.

Neacșu currently works at the "Club de gymnastique artistique Gadbois" in Montreal as a gymnastics coach. Her stepfather is Canadian film producer Rock Demers.

References

External links
Gymn Forum: List of competitive results

Living people
1961 births
Sportspeople from Sibiu
Romanian female artistic gymnasts
Medalists at the World Artistic Gymnastics Championships